Alex Mogilner is an American professor at the Courant Institute of Mathematical Sciences and the Department of Biology at New York University. His major contribution to science are in the areas of cell motility and division and innovations in cell imaging.

Biography 
Mogilner was born in the Soviet Union on May 22, 1962.  He received his doctorate in physics in 1990 at the Ural Division of the Soviet Academy of Sciences in his hometown of Ekaterinburg.

After two years of research at the University of Manitoba, he returned to graduate school at the University of British Columbia in Vancouver and received his Ph.D in applied mathematics, a program that combined math and biology. His current work is in computational biology, which combines chemistry, biology, math and physics.

Research and Innovations 
One of Mogilner's research topics is the mitotic spindle and how it is assembled. The mitotic spindle is what pulls conjoined chromosomes apart during cell division.

Mogilner hypothesized that the chromosomes were surrounded by proteins that directed the microtubules toward them. A few years after, research in Germany confirmed his prediction. His key papers on the subject have been cited hundreds of times; the most cited one, in Biophysical Journal has been cited 614 times by October 2014.

He is an Associate Editor at the Journal of Cell Biology and Bulletin of Mathematical Biology.

References

External links

https://web.archive.org/web/20100610101845/http://biosci3.ucdavis.edu/FacultyAndResearch/FacultyProfile.aspx?FacultyID=367
 Profile at University of California Davis
Google Scholar report

1962 births
Living people
Soviet emigrants to the United States
University of California, Davis faculty
Scientists from Yekaterinburg
University of British Columbia alumni
21st-century American biologists